Rakta Charitra 2 (Rakht Charitra 2 in Hindi) is a 2010 Indian political action thriller film based on the life of Paritala Ravindra. The film was directed by Ram Gopal Varma and written by Prashant Pandey. Primarily shot in Telugu and Hindi, the film is a sequel to Rakta Charitra, which released two months earlier. Shatrughan Sinha, Vivek Oberoi,  Sudeepa, and Radhika Apte among several others reprise their roles from the prequel while also featuring Suriya and Priyamani.

This film marks the debut of Tamil actor Suriya into the Telugu and Hindi film industries. The film was released in Tamil as Raktha Sarithiram, which was partly dubbed and partly reshot.

Plot

The first half-hour is a recap of part I, such as the events of how Pratap Ravi (Vivek Oberoi) takes revenge for the murder of his father and brother, as well as how he comes to power. When no one in Andhra has the courage to stand up against Ravi, a man comes into the light to seek revenge on Prathap. Yeturi Suryanarayana Reddy, a.k.a. Surya (Suriya) is seen waiting in the woods near the main road, waiting for Pratap Ravi and hurls a bomb at his convoy. Unfortunately for Surya, Pratap Ravi escapes the bomb blast. Pratap Ravi's henchmen attempt to kill Surya, but he manages to escape.

Surya informs his wife that he missed the chance of killing Pratap Ravi. Meanwhile, the media asks Pratap Ravi if this attempt is a Surya's revenge for the TV bomb placed in Surya's home by Pratap himself. Pratap Ravi denies the charge. Shivaji Rao asks Pratap to stop this vengeance, but Prathap insists on killing Surya. Pratap orders his action team to kill anyone who opposes him. DCP Mohan Prasad (Sudeepa) starts to investigate the case. He finds Bhavani (Priyamani), wife of Surya, and demands Surya to surrender or else he would harm his wife and baby son Arya. Surya thinks that he has missed a great chance and another chance will not come so easily and decides to surrender for protection plots to kill Prathap Ravi. DCP Mohan Prasad produces Surya in court to face trial. Prathap Ravi sends a henchmen to kill Surya in the court itself, but Surya manages to fight him and kills the henchman in front of the judge. Surya is sent to prison.

Pratap Ravi decides to kill Surya inside the jail, he plans carefully and decides someone from outside their camp should do this, so that the police does not suspect them. In prison, Surya befriends Muddu Krishna by telling him his story. The flashback shows that after Pratap Ravi's attempt to kill Narasimha Reddy (Kitty), Surya's brother wants to take revenge. Surya, on the other hand, doesn't want to take revenge straight away, and tells him to be patient and to leave the matter as it is, as he doesn't want to put his mother and sister in any danger. Within a few months, Surya's entire family is killed in the TV bomb blast. After hearing the story, Muddu Krishna decides to help Surya in killing Ravi. The henchmen in prison try to kill Surya, but Surya fights them back. After this failure, Pratap Ravi is warned by Shivaji Rao. As a result, Pratap Ravi decides that he wants to stop this revenge, and he meets Surya in jail. Ravi tells Surya to stop this bloodshed, to which Surya promptly replies, "I'll surely stop – after killing you". Prathap thinks he can't do anything because he is in jail, which makes him defenceless.

Enter Krishnaswamy, the opposition Party leader, who decides to meet Surya. He says that to kill Pratap Ravi, Surya has to become a bigger name in Anantapur than Pratap Ravi. Krishnaswamy requests Surya to ask his wife to stand in the election. Surya convinces Bhavani to stand for election. This makes Ravi to fear for his life and also for his ministerial post, consequently his henchmen want to eliminate Bhavani but Nandini (Radhika Apte) pleads with Pratap Ravi not to kill Bhavani, causing Ravi to abort the plan. However, one of Ravi's closest gang members, Umapati, is already on his way to kill Bhavani. Muddu Krishna kills Umapati and saves Bhavani. Krishnaswamy comes to the prison to thank Surya, and Surya thanks him in return.

A scared Pratap organises a meeting involving the leaders of all the districts in Andhra Pradesh. Knowing this, Surya plots to kill Pratap Ravi. He realises that in the meeting, all the leaders will participate with their bodyguards. He orders Muddu Krishna to dress like a bodyguard since no one would be able to identify whose bodyguard belongs to whoever. Using this ambiguity, Surya's henchmen can kill Pratap Ravi. After the meeting comes to an end, Pratap Ravi plans to leave. As he was leaving, he sees a familiar face and is struck. He sees Surya, standing in front of him with his handgun. Surya fires at Pratap Ravi until he dies in a pool of blood. Surya's friends put tear gas and create panic, and under the cover of smoke, Surya escapes from the scene and returns to the prison. Nandini cries by hugging her dead husband, Pratap Ravi.

Muddu Krishna takes the blame for killing Pratap Ravi for Surya. DCP Mohan Prasad comes to meet Surya in jail and justifies why Pratap Ravi became a factionist. It was the circumstances that made Pratap Ravi a factionist. He adds to Surya that the same circumstances will change him into a Ravi. Surya finally says, "Thank you, but I won't change into another Ravi". The movie ends with the birth of Pratap Ravi's child.

Cast

 Suriya as Yeturi Suryanarayana Reddy (Surya Narayanan in Tamil)
 Shatrughan Sinha as Konda Shivaji Rao
 Vivek Oberoi as Kattula Pratap Ravi
 Sudeep as DCP Dasari Mohan Prasad 
 Radhika Apte as Kattula Nandini
 Kota Srinivasa Rao as Rajidi Nagamani Reddy
 Sushant Singh as Shankar Ravi
 Priyamani as Yeturi Bhavani Reddy (Bhavani Gounder in Tamil)
 Zarina Wahab as Gajula Jayalakshmi
 Sushmita Mukherjee as Bolla Gomati
 Anupam Shyam as Recharla Omkar
 Vishwajeet Pradhan as Rajidi Puru Reddy
 Tanikella Bharani as Padalaneni Ramamurti
 Subrat Dutta as AK
 Ajaz Khan as Bhondu
 Viswajeet Pradhan as Puru Reddy
 Ragesh Asthana as The Jailor
 Swapnil Kothari as Chandrabhan
 Ruchi as Suryanarayana's sister
 Pragathi as Harita
 Narsimha as Shiri
 Umesh Jagtap as Nara
 Raja Krishnamoorthy as Narasimha Deva Reddy (Narasimhan in Tamil)
Subhalekha Sudhakar as Swami

Critical reception

Taran Adarsh of  Bollywood Hungama rated 3.5 out of 5 and said that "On the whole, RAKHT CHARITRA 2 highlights the emotion called vengeance most convincingly. It is chilling, raw, revolting, crass and ghastly, the kind that is meant to repulse you. But let's face it: It's a true depiction of human emotions." Renuka Rao of DNA India gave the movie 3 stars in a scale of 5, concluding that "Watch it if you had watched the first part, but don't be surprised if you don't like this as much." Nikhat Kazmi of Times of India gave the movie 3 stars out of 5, stating that "Rakht Charitra doesn't break new ground like Satya and Company, nevertheless it remains a must-see film for Ramu fans." Shubhra Gupta of Indian Express gave the movie 2.5 stars out of 5, and wrote that "Like in the first part, RGV's intention is not so much to delve into the complexities of Andhra politics, which stay firmly in the backdrop, but to create sequences where death is choreographed in varying ways. After a point, you are oblivious to the gore. But you cannot, at any point, bypass Suriya : he has eyes that speak. Bollywood is ready for him."

Rajeev Masand of CNN-IBN gave the movie 2.5 out of 5 stars, noting that "I’m going with two out of five for 'Rakht Charitra 2'. More blood and more killings leave you numb your seat.".NDTV rated 2 out of 5 stars vstating "Suriya saves the film from being a total loss. His expressive eyes have a quiet strength and his presence sears the screen."The Economic Times rated 3 out of 5 stars stating "The sequel carries forward the tale of power and revenge which exploded in Rakht Charitra 1."Rediff rated 1.5 out of 5 stars stating "RGV doesn't have anything new to offer in Rakht Charitra 2. The film does have some high points but they are too few to keep you engaged." Rakta Charitra 2 was simultaneously released in Telugu in Andhra Pradesh. 123telugu.com rated the film 3.5 out of 5 stars, praising the story, but noting the second half slows down and that, "Yes the climax could have been better".
Greatandhra.com rated the film 3.25 out of 5 and credited the film as "A Technical Masterpiece" and said that "This is an Charitra that haunts for a decade".

Awards and honours

Soundtrack

References

External links

Indian multilingual films
2010 action thriller films
2010 crime thriller films
2010s political thriller films
Indian films about revenge
2010s Hindi-language films
2010s Telugu-language films
Indian biographical films
Films directed by Ram Gopal Varma
Films about organised crime in India
Indian action thriller films
Indian crime thriller films
Indian crime drama films
Biographical action films
Political action films
Films set in the 1990s
Films scored by Sukhwinder Singh
Films set in Andhra Pradesh
Films shot in Andhra Pradesh
Indian political thriller films
Indian films based on actual events
2010 multilingual films
2010 films